The following is an ongoing list of international foreign trips made by Barham Salih, who currently holds the office of President of Iraq. Assuming this post in October 2018, he has conducted many state visits to different foreign countries, mainly in the Middle East.

Summary

2018

2019

2020

2021

References

Salih
2018 in international relations
Foreign relations of Iraq
Salih